The Richard Lounsbery Foundation is a philanthropic organization in Washington, D.C. It was founded in 1959, to enhance national strengths in science and technology (in the United States) and to foster strong Franco-American cooperation. To this day, the foundation has stayed true to its roots while expanding to promote science among youth, and to support components of US policy issues about science. The foundation supports research projects, science education, key scientific policy issues, and others.

History 
The foundation was set up from the Lounsbery family's wealth which derived from the extensive business activities of James Ben Ali Haggin, grandson of Ibrahim Ben Ali and the grandfather of Richard Lounsbery. It was founded in 1959 and has had charitable status since 1960. In 1967, after Richard Lounsbery's death, Vera Lounsbery, Richard Lounsbery's wife, and the family attorney, Alan F. McHenry, established the goals of the foundation clearly. McHenry became the first president of the foundation in 1980. McHenry's son, Richard, currently serves on the foundation's board of directors.

Presidents

Board of Directors

Mission 
The Richard Lounsbery Foundation aims to enhance national strengths in science and technology through support of programs in the following areas: research that helps build bridges between outstanding groups outside the US and American science; joint international research between nations in conflict; science and technology components of US policy issues; elementary and secondary science and math education, especially in New York City and Washington, D.C.; historical studies and contemporary assessments of key trends in the natural sciences; and start-up assistance for establishing the infrastructure of research projects or new fields of research.  Among international initiatives, the foundation has a long-standing priority in French-American cooperation.

The foundation generally provides seed money or partial support, rarely renews grants for continuing activities, does not normally fund endowments or capital equipment, and aims to achieve high impact by funding novel projects and forward-looking leaders.

The foundation takes a special interest in cooperative activities between French and American scholars. It may have been the first philanthropic organization to fund the Wikimedia Foundation.  A prospective Lounsbery grant in late 2004 accelerated Wikimedia to get US Internal Revenue Service approval as an educational foundation in April 2005.

The foundation's largest and most frequent grantees include the American Museum of Natural History, U.S. National Academy of Sciences, American Association for the Advancement of Science, Institute of International Education, French Académie des Sciences, U.S. Foundation for the Commemoration of the World Wars, and American Academy of Arts and Sciences.

The foundation's recent giving history is published on their website.

Awards and grants
Awards supported by the foundation include: 
 The Richard Lounsbery Award in biology or medicine.

References

External links 
 

Scientific research foundations in the United States
Foundations based in Washington, D.C.